Jonquil is a hue of yellow. It is the color of the interior of the central cylindrical tubular projection of the jonquil flower. The color takes its name from a species of plant, Narcissus jonquilla, which has clusters of small fragrant yellow flowers, and is native to the Mediterranean.

The first known recorded use of jonquil as a color name in English was in 1789.

Cultural references
Kurt Vonnegut uses the word jonquil in his novel The Sirens of Titan, Titan being the largest moon of Saturn.

Josh Ritter's song "The Golden Age of Radio" includes the line "Yeah you look pretty good in that jonquil dress".

See also
List of colors

References

Shades of yellow